Turtledove Clemens is an American privately owned integrated marketing communications agency based in Portland, Oregon. The agency's offices are in the historic Jefferson Station building.

Works
Founded by Earl Heims in 1942, it is one of the oldest currently operating advertising agencies in Oregon.

The agency provides local and regional clients with advertising, interactive, media buying, graphic design, and public relations services. The company has produced work for Oregon for Kennedy (1960), Oregon State Health Division (1987) and Oil Can Henry's.

History
1942: Earl Heims & Associates founded
1958: Harry Lenoard Turtledove joins Earl Heims and the agency becomes Heims and Turtledove Agency, which later became Turtledove Clemens, Inc.
1959: Produced campaign featuring appearance by Playboy Playmate Lisa Winters for opening of Nudelman's University Shop in Downtown Portland
1960: Handled advertising for John F. Kennedy's presidential campaign in Oregon
1969: Produced child abuse campaign for the State of Oregon; a poster produced as part of the campaign was later placed in the Smithsonian collection
1972: Jay Clemens joins agency
1977: Clemens becomes a partner and the agency is renamed Turtledove Clemens
1986: Produced Oregon Health Division AIDS awareness campaign 
1992: Acquired majority interest in Seattle agency Ballard Bratsberg
2007: Moved into current offices in Jefferson Station building
2008: "Visiting Friends & Relatives" campaign produced by Turtledove Clemens for Clackamas County Tourism & Cultural Affairs wins Gold Advertising Research Foundation (ARF) David Ogilvy Research Award
2011: Harry Turtledove dies

Associations
Turtledove Clemens also owns and operates Ballard Bratsberg, a full-service agency in Seattle.

The agency is a member of Independent Marketing Communications Network (ICOM), one of the world's largest networks of independent advertising agencies.

References

External links
Official Website
Instagram Likes & Views
How To Drive Traffic To Online Store?

Marketing companies of the United States
Companies based in Portland, Oregon
Privately held companies based in Oregon
1942 establishments in Oregon
American companies established in 1942
Mass media companies established in 1942
Advertising agencies of the United States